The Chronograph of 354 (or "Chronography"), also known as the Calendar of 354, is a compilation of chronological and calendrical texts produced in 354 AD for a wealthy Roman Christian named Valentinus by the calligrapher and illustrator Furius Dionysius Filocalus. The original illustrated manuscript is lost, but several copies have survived. It is the earliest dated codex to have full page illustrations. The term Calendar of Filocalus is sometimes used to describe the whole collection, and sometimes just the sixth part, which is the Calendar itself.  Other versions of the names ("Philocalus", "Codex-Calendar of 354", "Chronography of 354") are occasionally used.  The text and illustrations are available online.  

Transmission from antiquity

The original volume has not survived, but it is thought that it still existed in Carolingian times, by the 8th–9th centuries.  A number of copies were made at that time, with and without illustrations, which in turn were copied during the Renaissance.

The most complete and faithful copies of the illustrations are the pen drawings in a 17th-century manuscript from the Barberini collection (Vatican Library, cod. Barberini lat. 2154). This was carefully copied, under the supervision of the great antiquary Nicholas-Claude Fabri de Peiresc, from a Carolingian copy, a Codex Luxemburgensis, which was itself lost in the 17th century.  These drawings, although they are twice removed from the originals, show the variety of sources that the earliest illuminators used as models for manuscript illustration, including metalwork, frescoes, and floor mosaics.  The Roman originals were probably fully painted miniatures.

Various partial copies or adaptations survive from the Carolingian renaissance and Renaissance periods. Botticelli adapted a figure of the city of Treberis (Trier) who grasps a bound barbarian by the hair for his painting, traditionally called Pallas and the Centaur.

The Vatican Barberini manuscript, made in 1620 for Peiresc, who had the Carolingian Codex Luxemburgensis on long-term loan, is clearly the most faithful.  After Peiresc's death in 1637 the manuscript disappeared.  However some folios had already been lost from the Codex Luxemburgensis before Peiresc received it, and other copies have some of these.  The suggestion of Carl Nordenfalk that the Codex Luxemburgensis copied by Peiresc was actually the Roman original has not been accepted. Peiresc himself thought the manuscript was seven or eight hundred years old when he had it, and, though Mabillon had not yet published his De re diplomatica (1681), the first systematic work of paleography, most scholars, following Meyer Schapiro, believe Peiresc would have been able to make a correct judgement on its age.  For a full list of manuscripts with copies after the originals, see the external link.

Contents
Furius Dionysius Filocalus was the leading scribe or calligrapher of the period, and possibly also executed the original miniatures.  His name is on the dedication page. He was also a Christian, living in a moment that lay on the cusp between a pagan and a Christian Roman Empire.

The Chronography, like all Roman calendars, is as much an almanac as a calendar; it includes various texts and lists, including elegant allegorical depictions of the months.  It also includes the important Liberian Catalogue, a list of Popes, and the Calendar of Filocalus or Philocalus, also known as the Philocalian Calendar, from which copies of eleven miniatures survive.  Among other information, it contains the earliest reference to Christmas (see Part 12 below) and the dates of Roman Games, with their number of chariot-races.

The contents are as follows (from the Barberini Ms. unless stated).  All surviving miniatures are full-page, often combined with some text in various ways:

Part 1: title page and dedication - 1 miniature
Part 2: images of the personifications of the cities of Rome, Alexandria, Constantinople and Trier - 4 miniatures
Part 3: images of the emperors and the birthdays of the Caesars - 2 miniatures
Part 4: images of the seven planets with a calendar of the hours - 5 surviving miniatures. Copies of the emblematic drawings appear in a Carolingian text that portrays Mercury and Venus in heliocentric orbits.
Part 5: the signs of the Zodiac – no miniatures surviving in this manuscript; four in other copies
Part 6: the Philocalian calendar – seven miniatures of personifications of the Months in this MS; the full set appears in other copies  On December 25: "·INVICTI··XXX" – "Birthday of the unconquered, games ordered, thirty races" – is the oldest literary reference to the pagan feast of Sol Invictus
Part 7: consular portraits of the emperors – 2 miniatures (the last in the MS)
Part 8: list (fasti) of the Roman consuls to AD 354  At AD 1: "Hoc cons. dominus Iesus Christus natus est VIII kal. Ian. d. Ven. luna xv." – "When these [Caesare and Paulo] were consuls, Lord Jesus Christ was born 8 days before the kalends of January [December 25] on the day of Venus Moon 15" – is a historical reference
Part 9: the dates of Easter from AD 312 to 411
Part 10: list of the prefects of the city of Rome from 254 to 354 AD
Part 11: commemoration dates of past popes from AD 255 to 352
Part 12: commemoration dates of the martyrs  Line 1: "VIII kal. Ian. natus Christus in Betleem Iudeae" – "Eighth day before the kalends of January [December 25] Birth of Christ in Bethlehem of Judea" – is the oldest reference to Jesus' birth as an annual feast day
Part 13: bishops of Rome, the Liberian Catalogue
Part 14: The 14 regions of the City [of Rome]
Part 15: Chronicle of the Bible
Part 16: Chronicle of the City of Rome (a list of rulers with short comments)

Chronology of Rome

Kings of Rome [753–509 BC]

 Romulus son of Mars and Ilia reigned for 38 ... with Titus Tatius for 5 years.
 Numa Pompilius reigned for 
 Tullus Hostilius reigned 32 years
  reigned for 
 L. Tarquinius Priscus reigned 
 Servius Tullius reigned 46 
 Tarquinius Superbus reigned 25 years

The Dictators:

 Publius Cornelius Scipio Africanus
 [Quintus] Fabius Maximus
 Apulius Claudius [Caecus]
 [Publius] Valerius P[o]blicola
 [Lucius Cornelius] Sulla Felix
 [Publius Cornelius Scipio] Barbatus
 [Lucius Quinctius] Cincinnatus
 Quintus Fabius (?)
 [Marcus] Lu[v]ius Salinator
 [Gaius] Iu[n]ius Brutus

Rulership of the Caesars [48 BC–AD 324]

 C. Julius Caesar ruled 3 years, 7 months, 6 days.
 Octavian Augustus ruled 56 years, 4 months, .
 Tiberius Caesar ruled 22 years, 28 days.
 C. Gallicula ruled 3 years, 
 Tiberius Claudius ruled 13 years, 8 months, 
 Nero ruled , 28 days.
 Galba ruled 
 Otho ruled 90 days
 Vitellius ruled 8 months and 
 The deified Vespasian ruled 
 The deified Titus ruled 
 Domitian ruled 
 Nerva ruled , 4 months, 
 Trajan ruled 19 years, 
 Hadrian ruled 20 years, 10 months, 
 Antoninus Pius ruled 22 years, 
 The deified Verus ruled 7 years, 
 Marcus Antoninus ruled 
 Commodus ruled 16 years, 
 Pertinax ruled 
 Julianus ruled 65 days
 The deified Severus ruled 17 years,   
 Geta ruled 10 months and 12 days
 Antoninus [Caracalla] the Great ruled 6 years, 
 Macrinus rule 1 year, 
 Antoninus Elagaballus ruled 
 Alexander ruled 13 years,  and 9 days
 Maximinus ruled 3 years, 4 months and 2 days
 The two Gordians ruled for 20 days
 Pupienus and Balbinus ruled 99 days
 Gordian [III] ruled 5 years, 5 months and 5 days
 The two Philips ruled 5 years, 5 months and 29 days
 Decius ruled 1 year, 11 months and 18 days
 Gallus and Volusianus ruled 2 years, 4 months and 9 days
 Aemilianus ruled 88 days
 Gallienus with Valerian ruled 14 years, 4 months and 28 days
 Claudius ruled 1 year, 4 months and 14 days
 Quintillus ruled 77 days
 Aurelian ruled 5 years, 4 months and 20 days
 Tacitus ruled 8 months, 12 days
 Florian ruled 88 days
 Probus ruled 6 years, 2 months, 12 days
 Carus ruled 10 months and 5 days
 Carinus and Numerian ruled 2 years, 11 months, 2 days
 Diocletian and  ruled , 12 days
 Constantius and  ruled Reckoning from their appointment as caesar.
 Severus ruled , 4 months and 15 daysSeverus abdicated in April 307 and was executed 5 months later. The author extends his reign up until his death.
 Maxentius ruled 6 years
  ruled , 6 days.
 Licinius ruled 15 years,

Notes

See also
 On Weights and Measures

References
Salzman, Michele Renee. On Roman Time: The Codex-Calendar of 354 and the Rhythms of Urban Life in Late Antiquity (The Transformation of the Classical Heritage 17). Berkeley: University of California Press, 1991.
Weitzmann, Kurt. Late Antique and Early Christian Book Illumination. New York: George Braziller, 1977.

Further reading
Burgess, R. W. "The Chronograph of 354: its Manuscripts, Contents, and History", Journal of Late Antiquity 5 (2012) 345–396.
Burgess, R. W. "The New Edition of the Chronograph of 354: A Detailed Critique", Zeitschrift für Antikes Christentum 21 (2017): 383–415.
Weitzmann, Kurt, ed., Age of spirituality : late antique and early Christian art, third to seventh century, no. 67, pp. 78–79, 1979, Metropolitan Museum of Art, New York, ; full text available online from The Metropolitan Museum of Art Libraries

External links

Online text and images, full introduction and bibliography at Tertullian.org: Chronography of 354

4th-century illuminated manuscripts
4th-century history books
354
Ancient Roman culture
Late Roman Empire art
Specific calendars
Early Christian art